Mylett Road Section is a road cut that shows the geology of the Mydrim Shales. It is a Site of Special Scientific Interest in Carmarthen & Dinefwr,  Wales.

See also
List of Sites of Special Scientific Interest in Carmarthen & Dinefwr

References

Sites of Special Scientific Interest in Carmarthen & Dinefwr